Parippu Mahadeva Temple is a Hindu temple located in Parippu in Aymanam panchayath of Kottayam district, in the Indian state of Kerala. This temple mentioned as Nalparappil in the renowned Shivalaya stotra is closely related to Thekkumkur raja. Currently it is administered by Travancore Devaswom Board. Bhadrakali Mattappally Nambudiri holds the tantric rights of the temple.

Deity 
The presiding deity there is Lord Shiva, facing to the east. It is believed to be one among the 108 'Shivalayas' consecrated by Lord Parashurama.  Krishna, Sastha, Ganapathy and Bhagavathy are the subordinate deities. The main offerings to the deity are Dhara, Pinvilakku, Pushpanjali, Payasam and Koovalamala.

Legend 

The present temple was built by the 'Madathil Raja' (Edappally raja) in 825 AD. He belonged to Madathil palace near Parippu. The local chieftain Idathil Raja was not on good terms with him and both rajas devoted to Lord Shiva does not wish to meet at the Mahadeva temple that they visited regularly. As a solution, two 'Balikkalpuras' (traditional frontage) were constructed in the temple, unlike the other temples in Kerala has only a single Balikkalpura.

In the past, almost 141 Nair families settled in Parippu. Ancient art forms like 'Ezhamathukali' and 'Kavanayeru' attained great progress there. Parippu, which is close to the water bodies gained political prominence by the presence of raja's military unit and trade relations.

Festivals 
The annual festival (Thiruvutsavam) is hosted in the Malayalam month of 'Meenam' (March/April). Maha Shivaratri and Thiruvathira are other noted festive occasions.

References 

Hindu temples in Kottayam district
Shiva temples in Kerala
108 Shiva Temples

ml:പരിപ്പ് മഹാദേവക്ഷേത്രം